Leucoperichaetium eremophilum is a species of moss in the Grimmiaceae family. It is endemic to Namibia.  Its natural habitat is subtropical or tropical dry shrubland. It is threatened by habitat loss.

References

Grimmiales
Flora of Namibia
Vulnerable plants
Taxonomy articles created by Polbot